Rajiv Jasrotia (born 26 October 1973) is an Indian politician and member of the Bharatiya Janata Party. Jasrotia was a member of the Jammu and Kashmir Legislative Assembly from the Kathua constituency. He headed Municipal committee of Hiranagar for four years. He was the Minister for Forest, Environment, and Ecology of Jammu and Kashmir in a PDP-BJP coalition government in for a short period of over 6 weeks until the coalition failed on 19 June 2018. He courted controversy after participating in a rally in support of the accused in the kathua rape case.

References 

People from Kathua district
Living people
1973 births
Bharatiya Janata Party politicians from Jammu and Kashmir
Jammu and Kashmir MLAs 2014–2018